
Gmina Biskupice is a rural gmina (administrative district) in Wieliczka County, Lesser Poland Voivodeship, in southern Poland.

Villages
Gmina Biskupice contains the villages and settlements of Biskupice, Bodzanów, Jawczyce, Łazany, Przebieczany, Sławkowice, Sułów, Szczygłów, Tomaszkowice, Trąbki, Zabłocie and Zborówek.

Neighbouring gminas
Gmina Biskupice is bordered by the gminas of Niepołomice and Wieliczka.

Tourist attractions
St. Peter and Paul church in the Bodzanów
Church in the Biskupice
Palace in Łazany

References
Polish official population figures 2006

Biskupice
Wieliczka County